Club Baloncesto San Pablo Burgos, S.A.D., previously known as Club Baloncesto Miraflores and also known as Hereda San Pablo Burgos by sponsorship reasons, is a professional basketball team based in Burgos, Spain and plays in the Coliseum Burgos. The team currently plays in LEB Oro. The club's biggest success has been winning the Basketball Champions League in 2020 and in 2021.

History 
Founded in 1994, CB Miraflores played its first years in the provincial league of Burgos. Its professional team was created in August 2015 with the aim to replace CB Tizona, which could not promote to Liga ACB at the end of the 2014–15 season, as the main club of the city.

On 28 August 2015, after the resignation of Tizona to continue playing in the league for focusing their efforts in their trial against the ACB, the club was admitted in LEB Oro. Miraflores set the successful Baskonia as a model of sports management.

In its second season, the club qualified for the Copa Princesa de Asturias and promoted to Liga ACB on 10 June 2017, after winning the promotion playoffs without losing any game. Miraflores achieved the fourth promotion for the city of Burgos in five years after the two times of CB Atapuerca in 2013 and 2014 and CB Tizona in 2016; but no one of them finally could meet the requirements for playing in the top tier. With the admission in the new league, Miraflores moved from Polideportivo El Plantío, with only 2,500 seats, to the Coliseum Burgos, that has a capacity for 9,500 people.

The club achieved its first victory in the top league on 11 November 2017, after seven consecutive losses, by beating UCAM Murcia at home, by 89–86, and finished their debut season in the 14th position with 13 wins out of 34 matches.

Back-to-back Champions League titles (2020–present)
Two years later, Miraflores made its debut in European competitions by defeating Kyiv-Basket in the second qualifying round of the 2019–20 Basketball Champions League. After advancing to the regular season and later playoffs, Burgos qualified for the Final Eight. Played in Athens, San Pablo Burgos defeated the host team AEK in the final by 85–74. The team was crowned BCL champions, just five years after the professional club had been established. Thad McFadden, who scored 18 points in the final, was awarded the Final Eight MVP award.

As the winners of the BCL, Burgos represented Europe in the 2021 FIBA Intercontinental Cup, where it defeated Argentine club Quimsa in Buenos Aires to win the world club title. Burgos won the game 85-73, behind star point guard Vítor Benite who added 19 points and claimed the tournament's MVP award.

The following season, the 2020–21, Burgos had another impressive run after qualifying for the Final Eight with a 9–3 record in the first two group phases. On May 9, Burgos won its second Champions League title after winning the final in Nizhny Novgorod, defeating Turkish club Karşıyaka 64–59. Vítor Benite was named the league's final stage MVP. As winners of another Champions League, the team also qualified for a second Intercontinental Cup in 2022.

Sponsorship naming 
San Pablo Inmobiliaria Burgos (2015–2017)
San Pablo Burgos (2017–2020)
Hereda San Pablo Burgos (2020–present)

Logos

Head coaches

Players

Current roster

Depth chart

Season by season

Trophies and awards

Worldwide competitions
 FIBA Intercontinental Cup
 Champions (1): 2021
 Runners-up (1): 2022

European competitions
Basketball Champions League
 Champions (2): 2019–20, 2020–21

Regional competitions
Copa Castilla y León
 Champions (3): 2016, 2017, 2018
Burgos, Spain Invitational Game
 Champions (1): 2020

Notable players 

 Anton Maresch
 Thomas Schreiner
 Deon Thompson
 Ægir Steinarsson
 Deividas Gailius
 Augustas Pečiukevičius
 Tadas Sedekerskis
 Justas Sinica
 Sebas Saiz
 Corey Fisher
 John Jenkins

Reserve team
On 14 December 2016, Miraflores agreed a collaboration with local Liga EBA club Basket Burgos 2002, that became their reserve team. In 2018, Basket Burgos 2002 was integrated in the structure of the club.

References and notes

External links 
 
CB Miraflores at ACB.com 

 
Sport in Burgos
Basketball teams established in 1994
Basketball teams in Castile and León
Liga ACB teams
Former LEB Oro teams
1994 establishments in Spain